The German Seventeenth Army was a field army of Nazi Germany during World War II.

Operation Barbarossa
On 22 June 1941, the 17th Army was part of Army Group South when Nazi Germany launched Operation Barbarossa and invaded the Soviet Union. From 1 July, the Hungarian "Mobile Corps" (Gyorshadtest) was subordinated to the 17th Army. Along with 1st Panzer Army, the 17th Army encircled Soviet forces in central Ukraine during the Battle of Uman. Approximately 100,000 Soviet troops were captured. The 17th Army participated in the Battle of Kiev. Army Group South was ordered to resume the offensive, with the objective of capturing Rostov-on-Don, the gateway to the Caucasus oil fields, and Kharkov, a major center of heavy industry for the Soviet Union.

In October 1941, the army came under the command of Hermann Hoth, who was convicted post-war in the High Command Trial. Hoth was an active supporter of the war of annihilation against the Soviet Union. He called upon his men to understand the need for "harsh punishment of Jewry". In support of the Severity Order issued by Walter von Reichenau in October 1941, in November 1941 Hoth issued the following directive to troops under his command:

Under Hoth's command, units of the 17th Army took part in the hunt for and murder of Jews in its territory of control.

Battle of Stalingrad

In 1942, Army Group South was to spearhead the German summer offensive in Russia known as Case Blue. The 17th Army was to give flank protection to 1st Panzer Army as it struck towards the Don River. From June to July, the German 17th Army, the Italian Expeditionary Corps in Russia, and the Romanian 3rd Army were organized as "Army Group Ruoff". In August 1942, Hitler sub-divided Army Group South into two new army groups: Army Group A and Army Group B. Army Group A included the 17th Army, the 1st Panzer Army, and the 4th Panzer Army. Army Group B included the 2nd Army, the 6th Army, the Italian 8th Army, and the Hungarian 2nd Army. By October 1942, the Romanian 3rd Army and the Romanian 4th Army were added to further bolster Army Group B.

While Army Group B struck towards Stalingrad, Army Group A and the 17th Army attacked towards the Caucasus oilfields in what was to be known as the Battle of the Caucasus. However, by December with Soviet forces en-circled the 6th Army at Stalingrad, Army Group A withdrew from Southern Russia but 17th Army was ordered to hold the Kuban bridgehead. Hitler demanded a three-mile road and rail bridge across the Strait of Kerch in spring 1943 to support a push through the Caucasus to Persia, although the Cable Railway (Aerial tramway) which went into operation on 14 July with a daily capacity of one thousand tons was adequate for the defensive needs of the 17th Army in the Kuban bridgehead. Because of frequent earth tremors, vast quantities of extra-strength girders would be required, and their transport would curtail shipments of military material to the Crimea.

Crimea
By October 1943, the 17th Army was forced to retreat from the Kuban bridgehead across the Kerch Strait to Crimea. During the following months, the Red Army pushed back the German forces in the southern Ukraine. In November 1943, they eventually cut off the land-based connection of 17th Army through the Perekop Isthmus. Hitler forbade a sea evacuation of 17th Army because he thought the Red Army could use the Crimean Peninsula to launch air attacks against Romanian oil refineries. 

By the end of 1943, the Soviet command began landing troops in Kerch Strait and, by 10 April 1944, moving troops near the Sivash and together with an attack at the Perekop Isthmus forced 17th Army to fall back to Sevastopol. The German Supreme Command of the Armed Forces (Oberkommando der Wehrmacht, or OKW) intended to hold Sevastopol as a fortress, much as the Red Army had done during the first battle for the Crimea from 1941 to 1942. Inadequate repair to the defenses of Sevastopol made this impossible and, on 9 May 1944, Sevastopol fell in less than one month after the start of the battle.

The Army lost much of its heavy equipment in the Crimea. Considerable losses were suffered in terms of men lost in battle and losses associated with the sea evacuation. The Army was subsequently reorganized and continued to fight on the Eastern Front, including in the Battle of Bautzen.

Subordinate foreign units
 Hungarian Mobile Corps - 1 July 1941 to 24 November 1941
 Italian Expeditionary Corps in Russia - 3 June to July 1942
 Slovak Mobile Command (Pilfousek Brigade), reorganized in early August 1941 as Slovak 1st Division

Commanding officers

References

Citations

Bibliography

 
 
 

17
Military units and formations established in 1940
Military units and formations disestablished in 1945